The London Marathon is an annual marathon held in London, United Kingdom, and is the 2nd largest annual road race in the UK, after the Great North Run in Newcastle. Founded by athletes Chris Brasher and John Disley in 1981, it is typically held in April but has moved to October for 2020 and 2021 due to the COVID-19 pandemic. The 2022 edition was also postponed to October with Hugh Brasher stating "We believe that by moving the 2022 event to October we give ourselves the best chances of welcoming the world to the streets of London, enabling tens of millions to be raised for good causes and giving people the certainty that their hard work and training will allow them to experience the amazing crowds cheering them every step of the way from Greenwich to Westminster". The largely flat course is set around the River Thames, starting in Blackheath and finishing at The Mall. Hugh Brasher (son of Chris) is the current Race Director and Nick Bitel its Chief Executive.

The race has several components: it has a mass race for the public, professional races for men and women long-distance runners, elite level wheelchair races for men and women, plus a 3-mile mini marathon event for under-17 athletes. The mass race is the largest marathon event in the United Kingdom and its third largest running event (after the Great North Run and Great Manchester Run). There is a significant charity running aspect to the marathon, with participants helping to raise over £1 billion since its founding, including £66.4 million at the 2019 London Marathon which was the highest amount for a single-day fund-raising event.

Since 2006, the elite race has been part of the World Marathon Majors, which includes six of the world's top level marathon races. The London Marathon has seen the marathon world record broken on seven occasions: Khalid Khannouchi broke the men's record in 2002, while women's records have been broken by Grete Waitz (1983), Ingrid Kristiansen (1985), Paula Radcliffe (2002, 2003, 2005) and Mary Jepkosgei Keitany (2017). The current elite course records are held by Eliud Kipchoge (2:02:37 in 2019) and Paula Radcliffe (2:15:25 in 2003). The current wheelchair course records are held by Marcel Hug (1:24:38 in 2022) and Manuela Schär (1:39:52 in 2021).

The 2020 London Marathon was postponed and only allowed elite participants due to the COVID-19 outbreak. The race often has a title sponsorship, sponsored by Virgin Money for several years, it is branded the "TCS London Marathon" for 2022.

The 2023 London Marathon will revert to its traditional spring date which will be held on 23 April.

Editions

All information from official website.

NOTE:  The 2020 race was restricted to elite athletes in able-bodied (30 for each sex) and invited wheelchair athletes.

History

The London Marathon was not the first long-distance running event held in the city, which has a long history of marathon events. The Polytechnic Marathon (also known as the Poly) was first held in 1909.

The current London Marathon was founded in 1981 by Olympic champion and journalist Chris Brasher and athlete John Disley. Shortly after completing the New York City Marathon in November 1979 Brasher wrote an article for The Observer newspaper which began:

To believe this story you must believe that the human race be one joyous family, working together, laughing together, achieving the impossible. Last Sunday, in one of the most trouble-stricken cities in the world, 11,532 men and women from 40 countries in the world, assisted by over a million black, white and yellow people, laughed, cheered and suffered during the greatest folk festival the world has seen.

The first London Marathon was held on 29 March 1981, more than 20,000 applied to run. 6,747 were accepted and 6,255 crossed the finish line on Constitution Hill. The Marathon's popularity has steadily grown since then. As at 2009, 746,635 people have completed the race since its inception. In 2010, 36,549 people crossed the line, the biggest field since the race began. The first wheelchair marathon race was held in 1983 and the event was credited with reducing the stigma surrounding disabled athletes. In 2013 the IPC Athletics Marathon World Cup was held within the London Marathon featuring athletes of both genders in the T42–T46 and T11–T13 categories. In August 2013 it was announced that the event would be staged in London until 2017 and feature athletes in the T11-T12, T13, T42-T44, T43, T45-46, T51-52 and the T53-54 class.

For many years the London and Polytechnic Marathons competed with each other until, in 1996, the latter folded in due to the popularity of the former.

Following the Boston Marathon bombing, organisers of the 2013 London Marathon undertook a review of their security arrangements, despite no specific threats against the event. A 30-second silence was held before the start of the marathon to show respect and support to those affected by the tragedy.

Organisation
The race is currently organised by Hugh Brasher, son of Chris, as Race Director and Nick Bitel as Chief Executive. Previously David Bedford and Bitel had overseen a period of great change for the race, including amendments to the course in 2005 which saw the cobbled section by the Tower of London replaced with a flat stretch along the Highway.

Dan Tunstall Pedoe was the medical director of the London Marathon for 25 years between the first one in 1981 until 2005. In 2003, Pedoe was shadowed by Sanjay Sharma from St George's Hospital (University of London) who took over the role in its entirety in 2006. Medical cover is provided by 150 doctors. Also assisting were more than 1,500 volunteers of St. John Ambulance, who organise over 50 first aid posts along the route, and three field hospitals at the finish. St John Ambulance also provide a number of healthcare professions for the event, including nurses, paramedics, ambulances with crews.

The BBC covers the event, devoting rolling coverage for most of the morning. The theme music associated with this coverage, and with the event itself, is called "Main Titles to The Trap", composed by Ron Goodwin for the film The Trap.

There are three separate groups of starters: Elite Women, Wheelchair (Men and Women), and Elite Men followed by Mass Race.

Since 2010, the race has been sponsored by Virgin Money.

Course

The marathon is run over a largely flat course around the River Thames, and spans .

The route has markers at one mile intervals.  Although the race publicity (athlete advice, timing charts and so on) is mile-oriented, the individual timing splits that are available to competitors after the event are kilometre-oriented.

The course begins at three separate points: the 'red start' in southern Greenwich Park on Charlton Way, the 'green start' in St John's Park, and the 'blue start' on Shooter's Hill Road. The three courses converge after  in Woolwich, close to the Royal Artillery Barracks.

Heading next into Deptford and Surrey Quays/Rotherhithe in the Docklands, and out towards Bermondsey, competitors race along Jamaica Road before reaching the half-way point as they cross Tower Bridge. Running east again along The Highway through Wapping, competitors head up towards Limehouse and into Mudchute in the Isle of Dogs via Westferry Road, before heading into Canary Wharf.

As the route leads away from Canary Wharf into Poplar, competitors run west down Poplar High Street back towards Limehouse and on through Commercial Road. They then move back onto The Highway, onto Lower and Upper Thames Streets. Heading into the final leg of the race, competitors pass The Tower of London on Tower Hill.  In the penultimate mile along The Embankment, the London Eye comes into view, before the athletes turn right into Birdcage Walk to complete the final , catching the sights of Big Ben and Buckingham Palace, and finishing in The Mall alongside St. James's Palace. This final section of the route formed part of the 2012 Olympic Marathon Course.

Since the first marathon, the course has undergone very few route changes. In the first race, the course took a diversion around Southwark Park before re-joining Jamaica Road on the way to Tower Bridge and was routed through St Katherine Docks past the Tower Hotel, en route to the Tower of London and the cobblestoned stretch of road that in later years was carpeted, to help runners prevent injury on the uneven surface. In 1982, the finishing post was moved from Constitution Hill to Westminster Bridge due to construction works. It remained there for twelve years before moving to its present location at The Mall. In 2008, a suspected gas leak at a pub in Wapping diverted the course, but in 2009 the race followed the same path as in 2007.

Since 2012 mile 21 has become a significant cheer zone with Run Dem Crew transforming the stretch of Commercial Road outside the former Limehouse Town Hall into a street party with music and confetti cannons.

Due to the COVID-19 pandemic, the 2020 London Marathon was run on a non-traditional course, consisting of 19.6 laps of length  around St James's Park, taking in The Mall, Horse Guards Parade, Birdcage Walk and Buckingham Palace. The final circuit was  along the Mall, following the finish line of the traditional London Marathon course.

Results

London is one of the top six world marathons that form the World Marathon Majors competition with a  million prize purse. The inaugural marathon had 7,741 entrants, 6,255 of whom completed the race. The first Men's Elite Race in 1981 was tied between American Dick Beardsley and Norwegian Inge Simonsen, who crossed the finish line holding hands in 2 hours, 11 minutes, 48 seconds. The first Women's Elite Race, also in 1981, was won by Briton Joyce Smith in 2:29:57. In 1983, the first wheelchair races took place. Organized by the British Sports Association for the Disabled (BASD), 19 people competed and 17 finished. Gordon Perry of the United Kingdom won the Men's Wheelchair Race, coming in at 3:20:07, and Denise Smith, also of the UK, won the Women's Wheelchair Race in 4:29:03.

World records for marathon running have been set several times. Khalid Khannouchi, representing the United States, set the men's world record in 2:05:38 in 2002. The following year, British runner Paula Radcliffe set the women's world record in 2:15:25 (later briefly downgraded to "world best" by the IAAF as it was achieved in a mixed race, but restored to the title of "world Record" shortly thereafter); in 2017 Mary Keitany of Kenya set a world record of 2:17:01 for an all-women's marathon. Previous women's world records were set in 1983 and 1985 by Grete Waitz and Ingrid Kristiansen respectively, both of Norway. The current men's course record is 2:02:37 set by Kenyan Eliud Kipchoge in 2019. Marcel Hug of Switzerland set the Men's Wheelchair Race course record at 1:26:27 in 2021, and the Women's equivalent was set by Swiss athlete Manuela Schär in 2021, with 1:39:52.

Amateur runners

The race attracts amateur runners who make up the bulk of the thirty thousand or more participants; commonly running in fancy dress for charity causes. On 19 April 2003, former boxer Michael Watson, who had been told he would never be able to walk again after a fight with Chris Eubank, made headlines by finishing the marathon in six days. In 2006, Sir Steve Redgrave (winner of five consecutive Olympic gold medals) set a new Guinness World Record for money raised through a marathon by collecting £1.8 million in sponsorship. This broke the record set the previous year by the founder of the Oasis Trust, Steve Chalke, who had collected over £1.25 million. In 2011, Chalke raised a new record £2.32 million. The £500 that Claire Squires collected before the race increased to over £1 million after she died having collapsed during the 2012 race.

A small number of runners, known as the "Ever Presents", have completed each of the London Marathons since 1981. When the list was first established in 1995, there were 42. After 2019, their number has shrunk to 10. At the running of the 2019 event, the oldest runner was 85-year old Kenneth Jones, whilst the youngest runner was 60-year-old Chris Finill. They are all male.

Mini Marathon
The Virgin Money Giving Mini London Marathon is the sister of The London Marathon. The course is the last  of the London Marathon and is for u13s, u15s and u17s from all 33 London Boroughs along with 13 teams from ten English regions and three Home Countries: Scotland, Wales and Northern Ireland. There is also a Mini Wheelchair race on the day. The race doubles as the British Athletics 3mile Championships.

BBC live coverage

The BBC has broadcast live coverage of the London Marathon since its inception in 1981 and has broadcast the race in full since 1984. Originally hosted out-of-vision by David Coleman, more recently the main presenters on BBC One have been Sue Barker, Jonathan Edwards and Gabby Logan. The highlight presenters on BBC Two have been Jonathan Edwards (2007–12), Sonali Shah (2013), and Helen Skelton (2014–15).  The commentators between for the Marathon on the BBC were David Coleman, Ron Pickering, Brendan Foster, Paul Dickinson, Steve Cram, Andrew Cotter, Stuart Storey, Paula Radcliffe, Dame Tanni Grey-Thompson, Liz McColgan and Rob Walker.

Theme tune
The theme tune used by the BBC every year is from the film score of The Trap, a 1966 film about a Canadian fur trapper, starring Oliver Reed and Rita Tushingham. The music was written by Ron Goodwin and is performed by the Bournemouth Symphony Orchestra.

Sponsorship and marketing

The original sponsors of the London Marathon were Gillette, who sponsored the event from 1981 to 1983. Subsequent sponsors have been Mars (1984–1988), ADT (1989–1992), NutraSweet (1993–1995), and Flora (1996–2009). Virgin Money sponsored the marathon from 2010, after signing a five-year £17m sponsorship deal in 2008. In April 2013, the London Marathon renewed its sponsorship deal with Virgin Money for a further five years and the race changed its name to the Virgin Money London Marathon. In 2021 it was announced that Indian consultancy company Tata Consultancy Services would take over sponsorship of the London Marathon from 2022.

A number of other companies and organisations also use the event for brand identification and marketing, including New Balance, Lucozade Sport, and Fuller's Brewery.

See also
 London Triathlon

References

External links

Official map - splits given in miles
Results of previous races - splits given in kilometres
Interactive Route map from the Guardian (2009 route)
Historical weather information for marathon days in London
The Official Register of London Marathon Runners 2001-2010, published by Aubrey Books

 
Recurring sporting events established in 1981
1981 establishments in England
April sporting events
Marathons in the United Kingdom
Athletics in London
Sports competitions in London
Annual events in London
World Marathon Majors
Sports festivals in the United Kingdom
Spring (season) events in England
Wheelchair marathons
Athletics competitions in England